Matej Moško (born 26 February 1999) is a professional Slovak footballer who plays for MŠK Púchov as a defender.

Club career

FC ViOn Zlaté Moravce
Moško made his Fortuna Liga debut for ViOn Zlaté Moravce against Pohronie on 8 August 2020.

References

External links
 MŠK Žilina official club profile
 
 Futbalnet profile
 Fortuna Liga profile

1999 births
Living people
People from Púchov
Sportspeople from the Trenčín Region
Slovak footballers
Slovakia youth international footballers
Association football defenders
MŠK Žilina players
FC ViOn Zlaté Moravce players
FC Košice (2018) players
MŠK Púchov players
2. Liga (Slovakia) players
Slovak Super Liga players